, also known in short form as , is a Japanese manga series written and illustrated by Daisuke Ashihara. It was initially serialized in Weekly Shōnen Jump from February 2013 to November 2018, and transferred to Jump Square in December 2018. Its chapters have been compiled by Shueisha into 25 tankōbon volumes as of September 2022. In North America, the manga has been licensed for English release by Viz Media.

An anime television series adaptation produced by Toei Animation was aired on TV Asahi from October 2014 to April 2016. A second season aired from January to April 2021, and a third season aired from October 2021 to January 2022.

Synopsis

Setting
In  (280,000 inhabitants), a "gate" to a different world suddenly opens one day. Monsters called  start appearing from the gate. Humans are overwhelmed at first when their weapons are found to be useless against Neighbors, until a mysterious organization appears that is able to repel the Neighbors' attacks. The organization is called the National Defense Agency, or "Border", and has appropriated the Neighbor technology called "Triggers", which allows the user to channel an internal energy called Trion and use it as a weapon or for other purposes. By activating a trigger, the body of users is replaced by a battle-body made of Trion which is stronger and more resistant.

Plot
Four years later, people in Mikado City have grown used to the occasional battles with the Neighbors, and have returned more or less to their everyday lives. Border has become popular. One day, a mysterious white-haired student named  transfers to the local school. Kuga is actually a strong humanoid Neighbor, a fact that he wants to hide from Border. In the school he meets another student, who is secretly a C-rank Border trainee. Since Kuga is completely oblivious about life in Mikado City, it falls to Mikumo to guide him through it, and to prevent him from being discovered by Border.

Media

Manga

World Trigger is written and illustrated by Daisuke Ashihara. The series started in Shueisha's shōnen manga magazine Weekly Shōnen Jump on February 9, 2013. Due to health issues on the part of the author, it was put on hiatus in November 2016. The series resumed publication in the same magazine on October 29, 2018, and ran until November 26 of the same year, before being transferred to the monthly manga magazine Jump Square on December 4, 2018. Shueisha has collected its chapters into individual tankōbon volumes. The first volume was released on July 4, 2013. As of September 2, 2022, twenty-five volumes have been released.

In North America, Viz Media licensed the series for English release in 2014.

Anime

In May 2014, an anime adaptation of World Trigger was announced to start airing in October of the same year. The series is produced by Toei Animation and was broadcast on TV Asahi from October 5, 2014 to April 3, 2016. The series is directed by Mitsuru Hongo with series composition by Hiroyuki Yoshino. Toshihisa Kaiya and Hitomi Tsuruta are the character designers and animation directors, and the music is composed by Kenji Kawai. The cast includes Nobuhiko Okamoto, Rie Kugimiya, Hideyuki Tanaka, Nao Tamura, Jun Fukuyama, Tomo Muranaka, Yūki Kaji and Yūichi Nakamura. The series was slated to run for 50 episodes, but ended up having 73 episodes. In summer 2015, the World Trigger Summer Festival 2015 event announced World Trigger: Isekai Kara no Tōbōsha, a brand new series with an original story not presented in the World Trigger manga, and with new characters and concepts. This "new series" actually ended up being the "Fugitive Arc" of the anime, which ran from Episodes 49 to 63. On March 7, 2016, it was confirmed that the World Trigger anime would end, after it was announced that TV Asahi would be replacing the time slot airing it with sports programming. The Nagoya trio Sonar Pocket performed the anime's first opening theme, .

During Jump Festa '20, it was announced that the series would receive a second season, with the cast reprising their roles and Toei Animation returning to produce the series. Morio Hatano is the new series director, while the rest of the staff are reprising their roles. The second season aired on TV Asahi's  block from January 10 to April 4, 2021.

During Jump Festa '21, it was announced that the series would receive a third season. The third season aired from October 10, 2021 to January 23, 2022.

In North America, Toei announced in July 2015 that they would be producing an English dub with Ocean Productions. The series began airing in the United States on Primo TV on January 16, 2017. The English dub became available on Crunchyroll on February 11, 2020. In September 2020, Crunchyroll announced a "home video and electronic sell-through distribution" partnership with Sentai Filmworks to distribute anime titles on home video. The series was released on Blu-ray on June 8, 2021. On October 8, 2021, it was announced the English dub of season 2 will be released in 2022.

Video games
A PlayStation Vita action game developed by Artdink titled World Trigger: Borderless Mission (ワールドトリガー　ボーダレスミッション) was released in Japan on September 17, 2015. An iOS and Android game developed by Ganbarion titled World Trigger: Smash Borders (ワールドトリガー スマッシュボーダーズ) was released on July 21, 2015. It was later released on PlayStation Vita on February 17, 2016. Both were published by Bandai Namco Games.

Reception
In the year of 2016, a survey conducted by Oricon found that World Trigger was the 20th best-selling manga, with over 1.2 million copies sold. In a 2016 reader's poll on goo, the series was voted the 5th most likely to become a Weekly Shōnen Jump signature series. On TV Asahi's Manga Sōsenkyo 2021 poll, in which 150.000 people voted for their top 100 manga series, World Trigger ranked 14th. As of October 2021, the manga had over 15 million copies in circulation.

The anime series ranked 10th in the Tokyo Anime Award Festival's top 100 TV anime series of 2016. During NHK'S top 100 anime voting, World Trigger placed 158 out of 400, tied with Detective Conan: The Darkest Nightmare''''.

Rebecca Silverman of Anime News Network said that "World Trigger is an exciting read that distributes its information organically rather than relying on info-dumps."

The first season of the anime received criticism stemming from Toei's handling of the adaptation. Gabriella Ekens from Anime News Network referred to the production as "incompetent" and "baffling", stating "World Trigger'' isn't a bad show, but it's a terrible adaptation."

References

Further reading

External links
 
 
 
 
 

World Trigger
2013 manga
2014 anime television series debuts
Adventure anime and manga
Anime series based on manga
NUManimation
PlayStation Vita games
PlayStation Vita-only games
Science fiction anime and manga
Sentai Filmworks
Shōnen manga
Shueisha manga
Toei Animation television
TV Asahi original programming
Viz Media manga